Echinopsis eyriesii is a species of cacti of the genus Echinopsis.

Habitat 
Echinopsis eyriesii comes from Southern Brazil, Uruguay, and Entre Ríos Province, Argentina. 
It grows in lowland habitats up to 1,000 meters above sea level. In these areas, the climate is tropical or continental. Typically, winters are dry and summer are rainy. The precipitation reaches 1500 mm a year with average annual temperature 25–30 °C.

Taxonomy 
The species is named after researcher Alexandre Eyries from Le Havre, France.

Description 

E. eyriesii is a popular large caespitose cactus known for their large nocturnal flowers. It is the perhaps best known and most commonly grown globular cactus.

E. eyriseii is globular, elongated and approximately cylindrical. It typically grows to 15–30 cm high and 12–15 cm thick. In favorable conditions, E. eyriseii may form mounds up to 1.5 m tall and 2–3 m wide. The cactus is dark green and has 9 to 18 ribs, which have circular areoles with 10 to 18 spines each.

Its floral stem develops over the course of a month up to 20 cm long. The flowers bloom in the evening of either spring or summer. The flower usually blooms for a day, but may last longer in cold or rainy conditions.

Echinopsis eyriesii var. inermis, or Echinopsis inermis, is a spineless variety

Cultivation 
Echinopsis eyriesii needs fertile and well drained soil with sunlight to grow.

It should be watered in summer, but the soil should dry between waterings. The cactus should not be watered in winter so that the flowers bloom. The cultivation temperature may be as low as −7 °C.

References

Further reading 
 Edward Anderson “The Cactus family” Timber Press, Incorporated, 2001 
 James Cullen, Sabina G. Knees, H. Suzanne Cubey "The European Garden Flora Flowering Plants: A Manual for the Identification of Plants Cultivated in Europe, Both Out-of-Doors and Under Glass" Cambridge University Press, 11 August 2011
 David R Hunt; Nigel P Taylor; Graham Charles; International Cactaceae Systematics Group. "The New Cactus Lexicon" dh books, 2006

External links 

 http://cactiguide.com/cactus/?genus=echinopsis&species=eyriesii
 http://www.llifle.com/Encyclopedia/CACTI/Family/Cactaceae/8004/Echinopsis_eyriesii

Night-blooming plants
Flora of Argentina
eyriesii